The 1997 E3 Harelbeke was the 40th edition of the E3 Harelbeke cycle race and was held on 29 March 1997. The race started and finished in Harelbeke. The race was won by Hendrik Van Dijck of the TVM team.

General classification

References

1997 in Belgian sport
1997